Jon Laukvik (born 16 December 1952, in Oslo) is a Norwegian organist.

Laukvik studied church music, organ and piano in Oslo. Afterwards, he worked with Michael Schneider and Hugo Ruf in Cologne and Marie-Claire Alain in Paris. In 1980, he was appointed professor of organ at the Hochschule für Musik und Darstellende Kunst in Stuttgart. In 2001, he was appointed professor at the Norwegian Academy of Music in Oslo. Since 2003, he is also a guest professor at the Royal Academy of Music in London.

Awards
 1977: International organ week Nuremberg
 1977: International organ competition  (Deutscher evangelischer Kirchentag)

Publications
 Orgelschule zur historischen Aufführungspraxis

References

External links
 www.laukvik.de
 Member of the Norwegian Society of Composers
  Jurist for 2013 Westfield Center organ competition at Cornell University and Eastman School of Music

1952 births
Living people
Norwegian classical organists
Male classical organists
Musicians from Oslo
Academics of the Royal Academy of Music
21st-century organists
21st-century Norwegian male musicians